Larbi Chebbak (1946 – 30 January 2020) was a Moroccan footballer who played midfielder during the 1970s. His daughter, Ghizlane Chebbak, is also an international footballer.

References

1946 births
2020 deaths
Moroccan footballers
Date of birth missing
Place of birth missing
Place of death missing
Association football midfielders
Morocco international footballers
1972 African Cup of Nations players